James or Jim Shaw may refer to:

Arts and entertainment
 James Shaw (artist) (1815–1881), Scottish painter, topographical artist, and early colonist of South Australia
 Jim Shaw (artist) (born 1952), American artist and musician
 James Shaw (musician), Canadian indie rock guitarist of Metric and Broken Social Scene

Politics and law
 Sir James Shaw, 1st Baronet (1764–1843), Lord Mayor of London and MP for the City of London 1806–1818
 James Shaw (Canadian politician) (1798–1878), Canadian businessman and politician
 James Shaw (Illinois politician) (1832–1906), American politician, judge, lawyer, and geologist
 James Shaw (mayor) (1846–1910), Australian politician, mayor of Adelaide
 James Pearson Shaw (1867–1937), Canadian political figure in British Columbia 
 Jim Shaw (politician) (born 1946), American politician, mayor of Rapid City, South Dakota
 James Shaw (New Zealand politician) (born 1973), leader of the Green Party

Sports
 Jemmy Shaw (James/Jimmy Shaw, fl. 1840s–1860s), pioneer of early dog shows, dog breeder and promoter of dog fighting and rat-baiting
 Jem Shaw (James Coupe Shaw, 1836–1888), English cricketer for Nottinghamshire
 James Shaw (Yorkshire cricketer) (1865–1921), English first-class cricketer
 Jim Shaw (baseball) (1893–1962), American baseball player
 James Shaw (footballer) (born 1904), British footballer
 Jim Shaw (footballer) (1924–2009), Australian footballer for Melbourne
 James Shaw (American football coach) (born c. 1938), American college football coach
 Jim Shaw (ice hockey) (born 1945), Canadian ice hockey goaltender
 Jim Shaw (swimmer) (born 1950), Canadian Olympic swimmer
 James Shaw (wide receiver) (born 1989), American football player
 James Shaw (volleyball) (born 1994), American volleyball player
 James Shaw (cyclist) (born 1996), British road racing cyclist
 James Shaw (athlete) (fl. 2000), Paralympic athlete from Canada

Others
 James Shaw (British Army officer) (fl. 1972–2005), British army general
 James Shaw Jr. (born 1988), American electrical technician and hero of the Nashville Waffle House shooting

See also
 James Shaw Kennedy (1788–1865), born James Shaw, British Army officer of the Napoleonic era
 Jamie Shaw (disambiguation)